Philip Eugene Perry (born January 12, 1952) is an American R&B singer, songwriter, musician and a former member of the soul group, The Montclairs, from 1971 to 1975. He was also known for performing the opening song to Disney’s sitcom, Goof Troop.

Biography
Discovered by Catholic nuns while singing high masses in his Catholic Church (St. Elizabeth in East St. Louis), and a high-school talent show favorite, Phil Perry wrote and recorded his first single "Hey You" with The Montclairs, who were also based in East St. Louis. They were signed to the Archway Records label just before Perry turned 17 years old in 1969. The song is considered to be the first of a classic soul collection of Perry 'Old School' singles popular in the 1970s.

In 1972, The Montclairs recorded for Paula Records with minor soul ballads that included "Dreaming's out of Season," "Prelude to a Heartbreak," and "Begging's Hard to Do." The Montclairs left Paula Records and disbanded in 1975.  Perry then moved to California with former Montclair Kevin Sanlin, recording as a duo, resulting in two albums at Capitol Records in the early 1980s that were produced by Chuck Jackson and Dr. Cecil Hale. One song, "Just to Make You Happy," had a respectable level of success in radio.

In the 1990s, Perry scored his first number-one R&B hit "Call Me" (previously recorded and written by Aretha Franklin), a remake of the 1970 hit, as well as the top-forty R&B singles "Amazing Love" and "Forever" (written by Brenda Russell), all from the album  The Heart of the Man (1991), his first solo release.  Perry is also featured on many GRP Records projects, and is considered to be a GRP all-star, featured with such smooth-jazz icons as guitarists Lee Ritenour and Russ Freeman, and pianist Don Grusin.

Perry is a featured vocalist on recordings by Michel Colombier, Don Grusin, Dave Grusin, Freddie Hubbard, George Duke, Najee, Bill Withers, Barbra Streisand, June Pointer, Johnny Mathis, The Benoit-Freeman Project (David Benoit & Russ Freeman), Sergio Mendes, Bobby Womack, Chaka Khan, Fourplay, George Benson, and Will Downing, among others.  Solo hits also include "Love Don't Love Nobody" and "One Heart, One Love." He is also featured on the Bebe's Kids soundtrack singing a track with the late Renee Diggs.  Other film song credits include Roots, Pretty in Pink, Short Circuit, Mr. Wonderful, Nice Girls Don't Explode, Riding Bean, Captain Ron, and a cameo appearance in the 2009 release of the Harrison Ford film Crossing Over.

In 1991 he released his first solo album on Capitol Records, and toured with labelmate Dave Koz for the next several years, going on to record 4 more albums.

On September 11, 2001, Perry was scheduled to perform at the World Trade Center's lunch-hour jazz concert series between 11 a.m. and 1 p.m.  As fate would have it, he was spared from the devastation of the terrorist attacks on the Twin Towers. However, for the next few years, he sank into an artistic depression, and did not record again until invited by longtime friend Don Grusin, who he joined in September 2003 for a collaborative venture titled "The Hang." This CD/DVD project was nominated for a Grammy Award, and included Dave Grusin, Harvey Mason, Patti Austin, Natali Renee, Abraham Laboriel, Alex Acuna, Ernie Watts, Lee Ritenour, and others.

In 2006, former co-producer of the Magic album, Chris "Big Dog" Davis, urged Perry to record a collection of R&B hits titled Classic Love Songs as an independent one-off project for Shanachie Records. Since that time, Perry has recorded four projects for that label with Davis, including a project with Melba Moore.  In 2007 he reunited with Dave Koz and toured the country.  The same year, he released the album "Mighty Love," for which he was voted the 2007 Male Vocalist of the Year in the SoulTracks Readers' Choice Awards.  In 2008, Perry recorded a duet album with Tony Award-winning vocalist Melba Moore titled "The Gift of Love."  It was awarded the  Duo Album of the Year Award in the SoulTracks Readers Choice Awards.

After returning from a South African trip, Perry became ill during a performance with Pieces of a Dream, in October 2009, at Southern Connecticut State University.  Unsubstantiated rumors began to circulate that he had died. While there is no definitive medical diagnosis for the collapse, he was treated at a local New Haven hospital and released with the strong recommendation that he take some time off and rest.  In 2010, "Ready for Love" was released by Shanachie. Inspired to continue writing after his health scare, this effort featured more Phil Perry originals than in any of his earlier releases, which was said to be of great satisfaction to him.

March 2013 saw the release of Say Yes, his 10th solo album, and the 5th on Shanachie.  It charted in the Top Ten on Billboard and A.C. Smooth jazz charts, as well as receiving Smooth Jazz top vocal credits.  Two years after its release, Say Yes continued its steady climb to become one of Billboard's 2014 top smooth-jazz singles, featuring Perry in a classic duet cover of Where Is the Love? with Chanté Moore.

The 11th solo release from Perry on the Shanachie label—A Better Man—was #1 on the Billboard Contemporary Jazz chart in the first week of its release.

Discography
 1991 The Heart of the Man (Capitol)
 1994 Pure Pleasure (GRP/MCA)
 1998 One Heart One Love (Private Music)
 2000 My Book of Love (Private Music)
 2001 Magic (Peak)
 2006 Classic Love Songs (Shanachie)
 2007 A Mighty Love (Shanachie)
 2008 Ready for Love (Shanachie)
 2009 The Gift of Love (Shanachie)
 2013 Say Yes (Shanachie)
 2015 A Better Man (Shanachie)
 2017 Breathless (Shanachie)

The Montclairs featuring Phil Perry
 1972 Dreaming Out of Season (Paula)

With David Garfield
 Together in the Arms of Love
 Deep Within Each Man presented by Shorinji Kenpo (Japan)
 Road Buster (1989 Riding Bean anime)
 King of the Road (1989 Riding Bean anime)
 Running the Road (1989 Riding Bean anime)

With Kevin Sanlin
 1980 For Those Who Love (Capitol)
 1981 We're the Winners (Capitol)

References

External links
 Official site
 Official Phil Perry YouTube
 Breathless 
 A Better Man
 Say Yes
 Ready for Love
 A Mighty Love
 Classic Love Songs

American soul singers
American jazz singers
People from East St. Louis, Illinois
Singers from Illinois
1952 births
Living people
20th-century African-American male singers
American male singers
Private Music artists
Jazz musicians from Illinois
American male jazz musicians
21st-century African-American people